México En La Piel Tour was a concert tour performed by Luis Miguel in support of his albums México en la Piel and later his album Navidades during 2006–2007. On this tour, Luis Miguel performed his recent pop songs, his newest Mexican songs, and also his back-catalogue. Two press conferences were held to present the album México en la Piel – one in the National Art Museum (MUNAL) of Mexico City and another in Madrid (art gallery near the National Art Museum Reina Sofía). In late 2006, Luis Miguel presents his album Navidades in New York City.

History
To promote México en la Piel, Miguel began a tour on 13 September 2005 at the Save Mart Center in Fresno, California. The singer toured the United States, Mexico, South America and Spain. The tour ended on 23 September 2007 at the Hyundai Pavilion in San Bernardino, California. It grossed over $90 million from 124 performances and over 1.4 million spectators, the highest-grossing tour by a Latin artist. The tour's set list consisted of mariachi songs from México en la Piel, boleros and uptempo tracks from Miguel's previous albums. He included songs from his holiday album, Navidades (2006), for the tour's fourth leg.

This tour started in the United States during mid-September 2005 in Fresno, and ran by important theaters and places in the United States like Madison Square Garden in New York, the Gibson Amphitheatre in Los Angeles, and other cities like Las Vegas, San Diego, Chicago, Washington, D.C., Houston, Boston, Dallas and Miami.

By the end of November 2005, just after the US, he performed in South America, in places such as the José Amalfitani Stadium in Buenos Aires, Argentina and in the National Stadium and the Quinta Vergara Amphitheater in Chile, gathering over 200,000 people in only seven concerts. Later, he returned to the US and performed in Miami to close the 2005 tour.

In the start of 2006, Luis Miguel established a record of 30 consecutive concerts in the National Auditorium in Mexico City. After that, he toured several cities in Mexico such as Monterrey, Chihuahua, Torreón, Veracruz, Villahermosa, Cancún, Guadalajara, Culiacán, and Mexicali among other cities. The Mexican portion of the tour ended in Tijuana, with a memorable concert in which a storm hit the city during the concert. Days after that, Luis Miguel resumed performing in US cities. The leg ended in Las Vegas, during April 2006.

In November 2006, he returned from a long pause (during that time, Navidades was produced) to perform 5 concerts in Mexico, before ending the year. In May 2007, he restarted the tour in Spain, a country that he had not visited since 2004, in cities like Barcelona, Bilbao, Elche, Gran Canaria and Madrid. After one month of presentations, he did four more concerts in Venezuela, to close that part of the tour in Caracas.

In September 2007, Luis Miguel gave seven more concerts in United States to close the tour, including three concerts in The Colosseum at Caesars Palace in Las Vegas on Mexico's Independence Day, and other cities like Santa Ynez and Salinas.

Tour set list

Tour dates

Cancelled shows

Gallery

Band
Vocals: Luis Miguel
Acoustic & electric guitar: Todd Robinson
Bass: Lalo Carrillo
Keyboards: Francisco Loyo
Drums: Victor Loyo
Percussion: Tommy Aros
Saxophone: Jeff Nathanson
Trumpet: Francisco Abonce
Trombone: Alejandro Carballo
Backing vocals: Menina Fortunato, Gina Katon

Notes

References

Videoclips
 "Que Nivel de Mujer" in Chile (video at YouTube)
 "Usted" in Chile (video at YouTube)

External links
 Official site

Luis Miguel concert tours
2005 concert tours
2006 concert tours
2007 concert tours

pt:México en la Piel Tour